Paul Monaghan may refer to:
 Paul Monaghan (politician)
 Paul Monaghan (engineer)